Calabrian may refer to:

 Calabrian, the people or culture of Calabria
 Calabrian Greek dialect, a dialect of Greek spoken in Calabria
 Calabrian languages, the languages and dialects spoken in Calabria
 Calabrian (stage), a stratigraphic stage or subdivision in the geologic time scale, part of the Pleistocene
 Calabrian wine

See also
Calabrese (disambiguation) (masculine singular and feminine plural)
Calabresi (masculine plural)

Language and nationality disambiguation pages